Neocrepidodera transversa is a species of flea beetle from Chrysomelidae family that can be found in everywhere in Europe except for Andorra, Finland, Greece, Latvia, Monaco, Norway, San Marino, Vatican City, and various European islands.

References

Beetles described in 1802
Beetles of Europe
transversa